Buona domenica is a music album by the Italian singer-songwriter Antonello Venditti, released in 1979.

Track list
All songs written by Antonello Venditti.
"Buona domenica" (5:39)
"Stai con me" (4:37)
"Robin" (4:38)
"Scusa, devo andare via (un'altra canzone)" (3:59)
"Modena" (7:49)
"Mezzanotte" (3:19)
"Donna in bottiglia" (3:50)
"Kriminal" (3:14)

Personnel
Antonello Venditti: Piano, Vocals
Sandro Centofanti: Piano
Maurizio Guarini: Synthesizers
Andrea Carpi: Acoustic Guitars 
Renato Bartolini: Acoustic and Twelve-String Guitars, Mandolin
Rodolfo Lamorgese: Acoustic Guitars, Harmonica
Claudio Prosperini, Fabio Pignatelli, Massimo Morante: ELectric Guitars
Carlo Siliotto: Violin
Marco Vanozzi: Electric and Double Bass
Agostino Marangolo, Duilio Sorrenti, Marcello Vento, Walter Gonini, Walter Martino: Drums
Gato Barbieri, Marco Valentini: Saxophone

Production
Produced by Michaelangelo Romano
Recorded by

Antonello Venditti albums
1979 albums